The CWA New England Heavyweight Championship was a secondary wrestling title in the Century Wrestling Alliance. It was one of two secondary titles in use during the promotion's early years, the other being the CWA Television Championship, and dominated by Tony Rumble for much of its history. Rumble defeated Stanley Raymond in a tournament final held in Boston, Massachusetts on April 1, 1993, to become the first champion and went on to win the title a record three times. He was eventually stripped of the title by CWA President Victoria Van Ellen on January 24, 1998, when the CWA joined the National Wrestling Alliance, and was joined with the CWA Heavyweight Championship to create the NWA New England Heavyweight Championship. The title returned to its original name when the CWA withdrew from the NWA on March 10, 2007.

Title history
Silver areas in the history indicate periods of unknown lineage.

References

National Wrestling Alliance championships
Heavyweight wrestling championships
United States regional professional wrestling championships